Francišak Valancinavič (Franak) Viačorka (Viacorka) (Frantishek Valentinovich Vechyorko, born 26 March 1988) is a politician and journalist from Belarus, President of the Digital Communication
Network and non-resident fellow at the Atlantic Council.

Currently, Viačorka functions as Senior Advisor to Sviatlana Tsikhanouskaya, Belarusian politician. Franak is a visiting professor at the College of Europe

Educational and work experience 
Viačorka studied at the Belarusian Lyceum for Humanities (since 2003 existing in underground),  ournalism Department of Belarusian State University (from which he was expelled for political activities), the European Humanitarian University (exiled in Vilnius). Viačorka has two degrees in Communications (B.A.) and International Relations (M.A.). Franak graduated from Warsaw University and American University.

Viačorka also worked as a research media analyst for the U.S. Agency for Global Media (USAGM) focusing on Eurasia’s digital markets. His research focused on Russian and Chinese efforts to control the global media space, spread disinformation, and build the sovereign internet infrastructure. He has served as a creative director for the Belarus service of Radio Free Europe/Radio Liberty (RFE/RL), consultant for Freedom House.

Current status

Franak Viačorka is the chief political advisor to Sviatlana Tsikhanouskaya and the head of the international relations department of the Office of Sviatlana Tsikhanouskaya. He often appears in the Belarusian and foreign press. Franak is called one of the main organizers of mass protests in 2020 in Belarus.

Public activities 

He is the son of prominent opposition politician Vincuk Viačorka. Since his youth, Franak has been involved in the opposition movement to current Belarusian president Alexander Lukashenko. Franak was member of Young Front, a founder and formerly chairman of the BPF Youth (2008-2009), the youth wing of the Belarusian Popular Front, succeeded on October 10, 2009 by Andrej Krečka. Organizer of many demonstrations, political campaigns and flash-mobs.

 Member of the Board (2007-2009), National Council (2007-2009) of BPF Party. Chairman of a Commission on Culture (2007-2009) of BPF Party. Member of Belarusian Language Society.

Took part in Electoral campaigns in headquarters (2000, 2001, 2004, 2008). In 2010 - as a candidate in local elections to Mazyr City Council, but elections were falsified. Administrator of a Unified oppositional candidate Alaksandar Milinkievič website (2005-2006), United Democratic Forces of Belarus (2007-2009).

One of the founders and managers of Art-Siadziba - public open space for independent events in Minsk.

Director and producer of musical project "Partyzanaskaja Škoła" (Partisan School), musical compact discs "Ja lublu licej" (I Love Lyceum), "Vieru u Ciabie" (Trust you), "Partyzanaskaja Škoła" (Partisan School), "Pieśni Lisoŭčykaŭ" (Songs of Lisouchyks), "Janka Kupala - 125", ":be-x-old:Незалежныя". Producer of "Audiobooks in Belarusian" project.

Producer and Manager of "Cinema Dubbing into Belarusian" project. There dubbed Pulp Fiction, Shrek 2, En Liten Julsaga, Love Actually, V for Vendetta.

Repressions 
On February 18, 2008, Viačorka was expelled from his third year of journalism at the Belarusian State University, in spite of his excellent academic performance, for missing two exams. The fact that he was being detained by the police was not accepted as a legitimate excuse by the university authorities. A subsequent attempt to enroll in the exiled European Humanities University, a private Belarusian university operating in neighbouring Lithuania due to Lukashenko's restrictions, failed as Viačorka's name was on a list of persons banned from travelling outside Belarus.

It has been reported that on 16 January 2009, Viačorka was forcibly conscripted into the Armed Forces of Belarus by the authorities, despite having been found medically unfit. Several other youth activists, such as Ivan Šyła, were also drafted. As of February 2009, he was stationed in the air defence unit 48694 in Mazyr, Gomel Region. In the course of his training, it is alleged that he has been subjected to harassment by senior military figures in order to make him speak Russian rather than Belarusian, although both are legal for use in the military. As a soldier, Viačorka  fought for soldiers’ rights and the rights of local residents. On April 14, 2010 Viačorka was released from the army because of health problems. During his military service Viačorka participated as a candidate in local elections to Mazyr City Council.

During military service Viačorka was writing "Blog of Belarusian Soldier", which became very popular in Internet.

Viačorka has been arrested and imprisoned several times for his activities, last time in January 2011.

After being dismissed from the military, Viačorka was refused admission to Belarusian State University to which he applied eight times. He was also refused admission to all other public universities in Belarus, violating the law which provides guaranteed admission to dismissed soldiers. Viačorka is currently pursuing a degree in media and public relations at the University of Warsaw.

In January 2022, it became known that Viačorka, along with bloggers Roman Protasevich, Anton Motolko, and Stsiapan Putsila are suspected by Belarusian authorities on 10 counts.They are accused of organizing a conspiracy to seize power, inciting hatred, organizing mass riots, forming extremist formations, high treason, as well as a number of other serious crimes.

Cinema 

In 2006 he starred in the award-winning documentary titled "A Lesson of Belarusian" that chronicled Viačorka's life as a pro-democracy youth activist in the run-up to the 2006 presidential elections in Belarus. Viačorka's work with his fellow activists was followed for two weeks. His father Vincuk Viačorka was also featured, as was Uładzimier Kołas, principal of the Belarusian Humanities Lyceum and a prominent academic.

Viačorka is the co-screenwriter and second director of a fiction movie being produced by the Documentary and Feature Film Production Company of Poland about his time in the Belarusian Army and the situation for other young conscripts. Directed by Krzysztof Łukaszewicz. The film, "Viva Belarus!" was released in spring 2013.

Viačorka also played in Tutejszyja movie. This movie was forbidden in Belarus.

Scandals
Viačorka was accused to have 400 thousand euro on his bank account, but denied it.

Awards and prizes
 Institute for the Study of Totalitarian Regimes Award 
 Belarusian Democratic Republic 100th Jubilee Medal 
 Civil Society Leadership Award, 2016: by Open Society Foundations (OSF)
«Person of the Year», 2014: Nasha Niva: «For the efforts to promote Belarus national identity»
«30 under 30», 2013: National Endowment for Democracy. Featured among «promising young leaders, all age 30 or younger, who are working for a democratic future in 24 countries».
The Best Screenplay, 2013: €2000, Brussels Film Festival, for the movie «Viva Belarus!»
Vaclav Havel Fellowship, 2012: by Ministry of Foreign Affairs of the Czech Republic and Radio Free Europe / Radio Liberty, Prague, Czech Republic. Personally referenced by Vaclav Havel.
Literary Prize «Golden apostrophe», «Debut in Prose», 2010. Minsk, Belarus.
The National Human Rights Award “For Personal Courage”, 2009. Minsk, Belarus
«New Generation» Prize, 2008— «For Courage and Bravery in the Struggle for Freedom and Democracy in Belarus”, Chișinău, Moldova,
IDFA Bertha Fund Award, 2007, Amsterdam, Netherlands
«Best actor» at Lviv Film Festival (Ukraine) (2007)

References

External links

Franak’s dreams. Interview with Franak Viachorka
A Lesson of Belorussian
Repressive medicine functioning in Belarus
Pressurization of Franak Viachorka in the army
Criminal investigators trying to break into Franak Viachorka's apartment
Franak Viachorka Appealed to Court Against the Head of University
 Blog of Franak Viachorka
 The Free Cinema Of An Unfree Belarus

Living people
1988 births
Politicians from Minsk
Belarusian democracy activists
Belarusian dissidents
Belarusian language activists
Journalists from Minsk